Divya Maderna is an Indian politician from Rajasthan. She is a member of the Indian National Congress (INC) and was elected as MLA of the Osian constituency in the 2018 elections.

Life 

Maderna is the daughter of government minister Mahipal Maderna and Leela Maderna. Her grandfather Parasram Maderna also worked in politics, serving as a cabinet minister in the Rajasthan Legislative Assembly.

Maderna holds a post-graduate degree in economics from the University of Nottingham, England. In 2010, at the age of 26, she successfully contested the District councilpolls in Osian, Jodhpur. She contested the Rajasthan legislative assembly elections in 2018 for Osian, Jodhpur on a ticket of the Indian National Congress and won.

References 

1984 births
Living people
Alumni of the University of Nottingham
Women members of the Rajasthan Legislative Assembly
Indian National Congress politicians from Rajasthan
People from Jodhpur district
Rajasthan MLAs 2018–2023
21st-century Indian women politicians